Mihal is a given name. Notable people with the given name include:

Mihal Ashminov (born 1982), Bulgarian celebrity chef
Mihal Grameno (1871–1931), Albanian nationalist, politician, writer, freedom fighter and journalist
Mihal Kasso, Greek politician
Mihal Prifti (1918–1986), Albanian politician and diplomat
Mihal Thano (born 1993), Greek–born Albanian footballer 
Mihal Turtulli (1847–1935), Albanian oculist and politician
Mihal Zallari (1894–1976), Albanian historian, politician, journalist and poet

See also
Mihal, surname